Saber Hossain Chowdhury (born 10 September 1961) is a politician from Bangladesh and the incumbent member of Parliament in Bangladesh from the Dhaka-9 constituency. He was the president of Inter-Parliamentary Union from 2014 to 2017. He is the former president of Bangladesh Cricket Board. He received the Order of Friendship, Russia's highest state decoration.

Education and early career
Chowdhury's father is late Hedayat Hossain Chowdhury, the founder of Karnaphuli Group, a top conglomerate in Bangladesh. He was a graduate of School of Oriental and African Studies, University of London and holds a double honors degree in economics and politics. He has also received a diploma in law from University of Westminster, United Kingdom. Having begun his career in the private sector as an entrepreneur, Chowdhury embraced full-time politics in 1996.

Political career
Chowdhury is the incumbent member of Jatiya Sangsad from Dhaka-9. He served as Deputy Minister of Ministry of Ports & Shipping and, later, as Deputy Minister for Local Government, Rural Development & Cooperatives (1999-2001). He was the youngest Member of the Cabinet during this period. At Political Party Level Chowdhury was appointed in October 2001 as Political Secretary to President of Bangladesh Awami League, Sheikh Hasina, who was then the Leader of the Opposition in Parliament. Shortly thereafter, he was elected Organizing Secretary (1) of the Party with responsibility for Dhaka Division.

Inter Parliamentary Union
Chowdhury was the 28th President of Inter-Parliamentary Union (IPU). He was elected to the position on 16 October 2014 for a term of 3 years and is the first Bangladeshi to hold this post. IPU is the world organization of parliaments and is the focal point for worldwide parliamentary dialogue. IPU supports the efforts of and works in close cooperation with United Nations whose objectives its shares. It enjoys Permanent Observer status at the UN. As IPU President Chowdhury is also a member of the high-level group - Every Woman Every Child - a global movement to champion the health of women, children and adolescents led by former UN Secretary-General Ban Ki-moon.

First elected as a Member of Parliament from a central constituency in Dhaka-9 in June 1996, Chowdhury has been prominent in the enactment, through Private Member Bills, of groundbreaking legislation such as repeal of the Leper's Act. Now serving his third term in the Parliament, he is Chair of Parliamentary Standing Committee on Ministry of Jute and Textiles. Saber Hossain Chowdhury has been actively involved in Commonwealth Parliamentary Association (CPA) initiatives and served as a CPA resource person on orientation and capacity-building for Members of Parliament from Africa and the Small Island Developing States (SIDS) at the meeting of the Small Island and the Developing States Study Group on the Role of Parliament in Climate Change, held in Zanzibar, Tanzania, in May 2011.
As Chair of the Asian Advisory Group of Parliamentarians for Disaster Risk Reduction and Global Champion of the United Nations Office on Disaster Risk Reduction (UNISDR), Chowdhury has worked with parliamentarians in Seoul in 2012 and Vientiane in 2014.

Award
Chowdhury awarded by World Health Organization (WHO) on World No Tobacco Day.

On 17 October, Chowdhury was awarded by Vladimir Putin the "Order of Friendship" the highest state honour provided to foreigners for his contribution to global development through IPU.

References

External links

 Bangladesh’s landmark law banning torture
 Mr. Saber H. Chowdhury, MP of Bangladesh
 Inter-Parliamentary Union- Press Release

Living people
1961 births
People from Dhaka
Awami League politicians
7th Jatiya Sangsad members
10th Jatiya Sangsad members
11th Jatiya Sangsad members
Deputy Ministers of Shipping (Bangladesh)